Voices Across America: A National Town Hall was a live infomercial for Hillary Clinton which aired on the Hallmark Channel on 4 February 2008, the evening prior to the 2008 Super Tuesday primary election. The format featured questions from audiences across the nation being answered by Clinton in a New York City studio.

References

2008 in American television
2008 in New York City
New York State Democratic Committee
Political events in New York (state)
Hallmark Channel original programming
Hillary Clinton 2008 presidential campaign
2008 United States Democratic presidential primaries
2008 United States presidential election in popular culture